Nat Kalan also spell as Natt Kalan, is a town and Union Council in Wazirabad Tehsil, Gujranwala District, Punjab, Pakistan. It is populated and famous village of Wazirabad Tehsil.

Nat Kalan is one of the historic villages of the Gujranwala district as it was notable prior to the Partition of India due to Sikh Jutt majority with a number of Gurdwaras. After the partition, the rest of the natives were killed or forced to migrate to East Punjab. Nowadays most of the population of Nat Kalan are Muslims. This village is 17 km north of Gujranwala, near the town of Gakhar Mandi. You can find a college, a school, and a hospital in Nat Kalan. People tend to be very enthusiastic and keen on local politics, and the village itself has a relatively diverse community with different types of Muslims and Christians living in harmony. Cricket is by far the most famous sport in this village.

The famed author of Pakistan, Mustansar Hussain Tarar, wrote the novel Kaso Khashak Zamane about one hundred years of history and how the tragedy of partition affected of Nat Kalan village.

References

Cities and towns in Gujranwala District
Populated places in Wazirabad Tehsil
Union councils of Wazirabad Tehsil